John George Teasdale (15 March 1929 – 3 February 2018) was a footballer who played as a wing half for his local teams, Rossington Miners Welfare and Doncaster Rovers. He died on 3 February 2018, aged 88.

Playing career

Club career
He was playing for Rossington when the new manager of Doncaster Rovers at the time, Peter Doherty, signed him in October 1949. Teasdale initially played in the development sides set up by Doherty, joining up with his recent teammate and fellow Rossington native, Brian Makepeace. He gained his debut for the first XI in a 4–1 win at Chesterfield on 7 April 1951 in Division 2. In his 120 league and FA Cup matches for the club, he always played wing half, 79 times on the left and 41 on the right, never scoring.

International career
In May 1956, Teasdale went on an 18 match FA tour of South Africa and Rhodesia with 17 other players, some of whom were internationals and others international prospects. During the first match of the tour, he suffered a bad knee injury that ended both his tour and his football career.

In popular culture
Teasdale featured in the 1956/57 edition of Charles Buchan's Soccer Gift Book as one of eleven full page hand colored photos.

References

1929 births
People from Rossington
Footballers from Doncaster
Association football wing halves
English footballers
Rossington Main F.C. players
Doncaster Rovers F.C. players
English Football League players
2018 deaths